Alpesa was a genus of moths of the family Noctuidae.  It is now considered a synonym of Elaphria.

References
 Retrieved April 25, 2018.

Hadeninae
Noctuoidea genera